Carlo Ratti (born 1971 in Turin, Italy) is an Italian architect, engineer, inventor, educator and activist. He is a professor at the Massachusetts Institute of Technology where he directs the MIT Senseable City Lab, a research group that explores how new technologies are changing the way we understand, design and ultimately live in cities. Ratti is also a founding partner of the international design and innovation office CRA-Carlo Ratti Associati, which he established in 2004 in Torino, Italy, and now has a branch in New York City, United States. Ratti was named one of the "50 most influential designers in America" by Fast Company and highlighted in Wired magazine's "Smart List: 50 people who will change the world".

Ratti has been featured in Esquire magazine's "Best & Brightest" list and in Thames & Hudson's selection of "60: Innovators Shaping our Creative Future". Blueprint magazine included him as one of the "25 People Who Will Change Architecture and Design", Forbes listed him as one of the "Names You Need To Know".

Early life and education
Ratti graduated from both the École Nationale des Ponts et Chaussées in Paris, France, and the Politecnico di Torino in Italy. He later earned his MPhil and PhD degrees from the Martin Centre at the University of Cambridge, UK. In 2000 he moved to the Massachusetts Institute of Technology (MIT) as a Fulbright fellow, working with Hiroshi Ishii at the MIT Media Lab.

Vision
In a 2011 TED talk in Long Beach Ratti outlines the vision of an "architecture that senses and responds". Digital technologies are becoming networked and atomised, hence changing the interaction between humans and the built environment. It is as if our cities, buildings and objects were starting to "talk back to us". In a discussion with architect Peter Cook as part of the Royal College of Art 2011/2012 Architecture Lecture Series in London, Ratti traced back his vision to Michelangelo's "why don't you speak to me?" and to the Baroque and Art Nouveau periods.

Ratti's work deals with the built environment of cities – from street grids to plumbing and garbage systems – using new kinds of sensors and hand-held electronics that have transformed the way we can describe and understand cities. Other projects flip this equation – using data gathered from sensors to actually create dazzling new environments. The Copenhagen Wheel developed by MIT Senseable City Lab explores how any bicycle could be transformed into a network-connected e-bike by sampling changing a wheel hub. The project Trash Track uses electronic tracking to better understand and optimise flows of waste through cities. He has also opened a research centre in Singapore as part of an MIT-led initiative on the Future of Urban Mobility.

Ratti's work has been seminal in the field of intelligent or smart cities. In an article published in Scientific American together with Anthony M. Townsend, however, Ratti contrasts the prevailing technocratic vision of smart cities – highlighting instead the "human face" of urban technologies and their potential in promoting bottom-up social empowerment.

Architecture and design
Ratti's designs inventively bridge the digital and the physical. The Digital Water Pavilion at the World Expo 2008 in Zaragoza, developed by CRA-Carlo Ratti Associati design practice, reacts to visitors by having streams of water part to let them through. Its literally fluid architecture was considered by Time magazine as one of the "Best Inventions of the Year". In CRA's extension of the Trussardi fashion house in Milan's central in Piazza della Scala, developed with botanist Patrick Blanc, a green vertical canopy is suspended on a crystal box to promote new interactions with people on the inside and the outside. An un-built proposal for the 2012 Summer Olympics in London turns a landmark building into a "Cloud" of blinking interactive art.

Several design projects rely on data visualisation. Real Time Rome, which filled an entire pavilion at the 2006 Venice Biennale of Architecture, explored real time dynamics of a city mapped through cellphone data. New York Talk Exchange, exhibited at MoMA in New York City as part of the exhibition "Design and the Elastic Mind", moved further to explore global communication flows together with Saskia Sassen. Several projects from the MIT Senseable City Lab were included in Fast Company "Best Infographics of 2011". A data analysis and visualisation project resulted in an Op-Ed in The New York Times to redesign the map of the United States.

During the 2013 Milan Design Week ("Salone del Mobile") CRA ventured into product design with a project for Italian furniture manufacturer Cassina, called "Our Universe". At the same venue another project, called "Makr Shakr", explored The Third Industrial Revolution and its effect on creativity and design through the simple process of making a drink.

Ratti curated the "Future Food District" – one of the themed pavilions at Expo 2015 in Milan. In 2017, CRA was part of the team led by developer Lendlease which won the international competition to transform the former area of Milan's Expo 2015 into a district focused on science and innovation (MIND-Milan Innovation District).

Teaching and activism
Ratti has taught at the Politecnico di Torino, the Ecole Nationale des Ponts et Chaussees, Harvard University, Strelka Institute and MIT. The class "Urban Infoscape" taught at the Harvard Graduate School of Design in 2004 was central to setting the vision of the MIT Senseable City Lab. In 2011, Ratti was a Lab Team member and curator for the Berlin location of the BMW Guggenheim Lab. He was also a program director at the Strelka Institute for Media, Architecture and Design in Moscow.

While a PhD student at the University of Cambridge, Ratti was one of the initiators of Progetto Collegium for the reform of Italian universities, together with philosophers Umberto Eco and Marco Santambrogio. The project led to the foundation of the Collegio di Milano and other institutions in Italy. Ratti has been involved in several civic initiatives – most notably to preserve Italy's industrial architecture heritage.
 In June 2007 the Italian Minister of Culture and Tourism Francesco Rutelli selected Ratti as a member of the Italian Design Council – an advisory board to the Italian government that includes 25 leaders of design in Italy. 
 In 2009 Ratti worked on several civic initiatives in Brisbane, Australia, after being named Queensland's inaugural Innovator in Residence – a Queensland Government initiative that invites world-renowned thinkers to bring their own unique perspective to the issues currently affecting Queenslanders.
Between 2015 and 2018, he served as special adviser on Urban Innovation to the President and Commissioners of the European Commission.
 Since 2009 he has been a delegate to the World Economic Forum in Davos and is currently serving as co-chair of the Global Future Council on Cities and Urbanization.
 Since 2015 he is visiting professor at Technische Universität München at the Department of Architecture, within the Fellowship Program of TUM Institute of Advanced Study.
 Since 2016 he is principal Investigator at the Amsterdam Institute for Advanced Metropolitan Solutions (AMS Institute).

Start-ups founded
Ratti is also the founder of several start-ups, both in the United States and in Europe.

Launched in 2014, Makr Shakr is a startup producing robotic bartending systems, whose products have been installed aboard Royal Caribbean cruise ships as well as in malls and hotels in the US, France, the UK, and Italy.

In 2018, Ratti contributed to the launch of Scribit, a company manufacturing a portable, wall-mounted drawing robot. In 2019, Scribit was named among Time magazine's Innovation of the Year.

Scientific contributions and writing
Ratti has authored over 500 publications, including a book on Opensource Architecture together with Joseph Grima for Italian publisher Einaudi (later published in English by Thames&Hudson) and the essay "The City of Tomorrow", co-written with Matthew Claudel for Yale University Press.

In a seminal paper in Environment and Planning B, Ratti questions the validity of the urban analysis technique Space Syntax. He has been opening the way in exploring the use of cellphone data to understand urban dynamics, which has now developed into an established field of scientific investigation. In general, the MIT Senseable City Lab works on papers that use network analysis and complexity science to better understand cities. Such aspects were discussed by Ratti in Seed magazine's Salon, together with mathematician Steven Strogatz.

Ratti often writes editorials and articles on international media. As well as being a contributor to Project Syndicate, he has written for Scientific American, The Architectural Review, La Stampa, BBC, The Huffington Post, The New York Times, Domus, Il Sole 24 Ore.

He appeared on BBC Radio 4's The Museum of Curiosity in November 2019. His hypothetical donation to this imaginary museum was "A bionic arm".

References

External links

 

21st-century Italian architects
Polytechnic University of Turin alumni
MIT School of Architecture and Planning faculty
Alumni of the University of Cambridge
Architects from Turin
1971 births
Living people
Fulbright alumni